Antirhea radiata is a species of plant in the family Rubiaceae. It is found in Cuba, the Dominican Republic, and Haiti. It is threatened by habitat loss.

References
 

radiata
Flora of Cuba
Flora of the Dominican Republic
Flora of Haiti
Vulnerable plants
Taxonomy articles created by Polbot
Taxobox binomials not recognized by IUCN